Events in the year 995 in Norway.

Incumbents
 Monarch – Olaf Tryggvason.

Deaths
Haakon Sigurdsson, earl (born c. 937)

References

Norway